Zheng Saisai was the defending champion, but chose to participate in Madrid instead.

Hiroko Kuwata won the title, defeating Wang Qiang in the final, 6–2, 2–6, 6–4.

Seeds

Main draw

Finals

Top half

Bottom half

References 
 Main draw

Kangaroo Cup - Singles
Kangaroo Cup
2016 in Japanese tennis